Matt Guildea is a former association football player who represented New Zealand at international level.

Guildea made his full All Whites debut in a 0-0 draw with New Caledonia on 25 July 1969 and ended his international playing career with six A-international caps to his credit, his final cap an appearance in a 0-2 loss to Israel on 1 October 1969.

References 

Year of birth missing (living people)
Living people
New Zealand association footballers
New Zealand international footballers
Association football forwards